Hillbilly Requests (originally Hillbilly Request Time) was an Australian television series, which ran from 1957 to 1958 on Melbourne station GTV-9. Representing an early effort at music/variety programming by the station, it was hosted by Tom Campbell and each episode featured the Victoria Banjo Club. The program had an unusual running time of 25 minutes as opposed to the usual 30 minutes. Originally aired at 6:30PM, it spent most of its run at 6:15PM, running to 6:40PM, preceded by the Happy Show and followed by the evening newscast with Eric Pearce. The archival status of the series is not known.

References

External links

Nine Network original programming
1957 Australian television series debuts
1958 Australian television series endings
Australian music television series
English-language television shows
Black-and-white Australian television shows